Pineappleskunk is the second solo release by Doug Pinnick of King's X.

Initial copies of the album were released with the bonus disc entitled 'Live Bootleg Video'. The concert was recorded at Instant Karma Club in Houston, Texas, on September 4, 1999, and runs for 54 minutes.

'Pineappleskunk' Track Listing

Personnel
 Doug Pinnick - Vocal, Bass Guitar, Guitar
 Jerry Gaskill - Drums
 Answering Machine Voices – Chris Brown, Doug VanPelt (Heaven's Edge/HM (magazine) magazine founder), Jimi Hazel (24-7 Spyz) and John Crumbley

'Live Bootleg Video' Track Listing

References

2001 albums
Doug Pinnick albums
Metal Blade Records albums